is a Japanese-Taiwanese pop singer. Her mother is Japanese and her father is Taiwanese. She can speak three languages: Japanese, English, and Mandarin. Tae Hitoto is her older sister. Her name Hitoto is not her real surname, it is her mother's maiden name. She changed her name when she came to Japan. Her father died when she was very young, and her mother died when she was 16. She is well known for her smash hit single Hanamizuki released in 2004 which she wrote inspired by the events of the September 11 attacks in the United States, the song has been covered by many artists around the world.

History
Soon after she was born in Tokyo, Hitoto moved to Taipei, and after she completed kindergarten in Taipei, she moved back to Tokyo and she has lived there ever since. She graduated from the department of Environmental Information of Keio University and participated in the Keio University a cappella group, K.O.E., during her days as a student. She used to have live concerts on the street with fellow K.O.E. members before she met Yōichi Kitayama, a member of the famous Japanese a cappella group the Gospellers. Kitayama encouraged Hitoto to compose her own music. Before this encounter, she had been a backup singer for many other artists.

To date, Hitoto has released eleven single CDs and four albums.

Hitoto's debut single "Morai naki" propelled her to stardom, and her songs enjoy wide popularity. Her clear voice and singing style, which is compared to the style of folk songs of Okinawa, attract many fans.

In Taiwan she is known for singing a Taiwanese folk song (Bāng Chhun-hong), which was included in her second album, as part of a Kirin beer commercial aired in Taiwan.

Hitoto performs a song at the finale of the game Dynasty Warriors 3.

In 2003 she debuted in her first film Café Lumière, as the lead character Yoko.

Her latest compilation album sold over 700,000 copies (Triple-Platinum status in Japan), becoming her best selling album yet.

On March 11, 2022, Hitoto participated in the Shuichi "Ponta" Murakami tribute concert "One Last Live", performing "Fever" and "Hana Mizuki". She also joined Mie in performing the Pink Lady hit single "Pepper Keibu".

Discography

Albums
 月天心 Tsukitenshin (December 18, 2002)
 一青想 Hito-Omoi (April 7, 2004)
 ＆ (December 21, 2005)
 Bestyo (November 29, 2006)
 Key (March 5, 2008)
 Karengai '花蓮街' Hualien City (April 21, 2010)
 Hitotoiro '一青十色; Hitoto Color' (June 27, 2012)
 Watashi Juusou '私重奏; I Instrumental Ensemble' (Oct 22, 2014)

Singles
 もらい泣き Morai-Naki (October 30, 2002)
 大家 Dajia (March 19, 2003)
 金魚すくい Kingyo Sukui (July 4, 2003)
 江戸ポルカ／夢なかば Edo Polka/Yume Nakaba (November 12, 2003)
 ハナミズキ Hanamizuki (February 11, 2004), NTV Tuesday Suspense Drama, JRA commercial song
 影踏み Kagefumi (April 20, 2005), JRA commercial song
 かざぐるま Kazaguruma (September 21, 2005)
 指切り Yubikiri (December 7, 2005)
 つないで手 Tsunaide Te (September 19, 2007)
 「ただいま」 Tadaima  (December 5, 2007)
 受け入れて Uke-Irete (January 30, 2008)
 はじめて Hajimete (November 19, 2008), the theme song for "Gyōretsu no Dekiru Hōritsu Sōdanjo Cambodia Gakkō Kensetsu Project" (Nippon Television Network Corp.)
 ユア メディスン～私があなたの薬になってあげる; I'll Become Your Medicine (October 7, 2009)
 うんと幸せ; Lots Of Happiness (November 4, 2009)
 冬めく / 花のあと; Wintry / Remains Of A Flower (February 24, 2010)
 dots and lines / とめる(May 23, 2012)
 道案内 / 愛と誠のファンタアジア (June 6, 2012)
 蛍; Firefly (March 26, 2014)

Videos
 姿見一青也 Sugatami Hitotonari (October 1, 2003)
 一青窈 LIVE TOUR 2004 ～てとしゃん Hitoto You LIVE TOUR 2004 ~Tetoshan (April 11, 2004)
 一青窈★夢街バンスキング～はいらんせ～ Hitoto You ★ Yumemachi Vanceking ~Hairanse~ (February 1, 2006)
 Yo&U TOUR '06 (September 6, 2006)

Filmography

Films
In Cafe Lumiere as Yoko

References

External links
 Yō Hitoto Official Site
 Hitoto's Webpage
 Nippop Profile |Yō Hitoto
 Yō Hitoto fanlisting

1976 births
Living people
Japanese women pop singers
Japanese people of Taiwanese descent
Nippon Columbia artists
Keio University alumni
Musicians from Taipei
Singers from Tokyo
21st-century Japanese women singers
21st-century Japanese singers